The  is a compact crossover SUV with four-wheel drive capabilities produced from November 1994 to August 2000 by Nissan. A prototype was first shown at the October 1993 Tokyo Auto show. It was offered with three different inline-four engines: from the original 1.5-liter GA15DE, to a larger 1.8-liter SR18DE, and finally a 2.0-liter SR20DE in the Rasheen Forza. The car has five seats and a rugged, quirky and angularly styled body. It is a very small and short four-wheel drive that is often compared to Eastern European cars in design, particularly the Wartburg 353, but is also reminiscent of Nissan's "Pike" cars (Be-1, Pao, Figaro, and S-Cargo). As for the Be-1 and Figaro, Rasheen production was carried out by contract manufacturer Takada Kogyo. It was exclusive to Nissan Japanese dealership network called Nissan Red Stage.

The Rasheen shared its platform with the Nissan Sunny (B14), including adopting the chassis NB14. Rasheen also used powertrain components from the Nissan Pulsar (N14) with four-wheel drive.

It had full-time four wheel drive, Nissan's ATTESA powertrain system. This is a viscous coupling that determines where to send torque based on traction situations. Anti-lock brakes were introduced September 1996 along with various trim packages introduced during the production period. Originally only built with a  1.5-liter inline-four, the  1.8-liter engine was added to the lineup in January 1997, only available with the automatic transmission. After having been shown at the 1997 Tokyo Motor Show, the even bigger SR20DE-engined Rasheen Forza was added in July 1998. This produced . By August 2000 production had come to a halt, amidst the restructuring following Carlos Ghosn's "Nissan Revival Plan" and Nissan Rasheen was replaced by Nissan X-Trail/Rogue.

References

External links 

 Nissan Rasheen

Rasheen
All-wheel-drive vehicles
Cars introduced in 1994
2000s cars
Retro-style automobiles